Beastwars is the eponymous debut studio album of the New Zealand-based heavy metal band Beastwars. The album was released on 9 May 2011 through New Zealand independent label Destroy Records, and was distributed by Universal Music. Beastwars received general critical acclaim from New Zealand publications, and reached an RIANZ album chart placing of #15. The album enjoyed further success at the 2011 New Zealand Music Awards, receiving a nomination for best New Zealand rock album and winning the award for best album artwork or packaging. It was also shortlisted for the 2012 Taite Music Prize.

Track listing

Personnel
Beastwars
Clayton Anderson – guitars
Nathan Hickey – drums
Matt Hyde – vocals
James Woods – bass guitar

Charts

References

2011 debut albums
Beastwars (band) albums